Lophostethus negus is a moth of the family Sphingidae. It is known from highland forests in Ethiopia.

It is similar to Lophostethus dumolinii, but smaller and the margin of the forewings is much less crenulated, the ground colour is much darker and more purplish and the stigmata is smaller and more golden. It is also much less heavily marked below.

References

Endemic fauna of Ethiopia
Smerinthini
Moths described in 1926
Insects of Ethiopia
Moths of Africa